Waiter! is a 1983 French film directed by Claude Sautet and starring Yves Montand, Nicole Garcia, Jacques Villeret, Marie Dubois, Dominique Laffin, and Bernard Fresson. It received 4 César nominations, for Best Actor, Best Supporting Actor (twice) and Best Sound.

Plot 
Alex, a former tap dancer, is an aging cafe waiter (chef de rang) in a large Parisian brasserie. He lives with his friend Gilbert, who also works at the brewery. Separated from his wife for a long time, he accumulates conquests. His dream: building an amusement park by the sea...

Cast 
Yves Montand - Alex
Nicole Garcia - Claire
Jacques Villeret - Gilbert
Rosy Varte - Gloria
Marie Dubois - Marie-Pierre
Dominique Laffin - Coline
Clémentine Célarié - Margot
Jean-Claude Bouillaud - Urbain
Bernard Fresson - Francis
Nicolas Vogel - Maxime
Pierre-Loup Rajot - Maurice
Marianne Comtell - Mme Pierreux

External links 

1983 films
1980s French-language films
1983 drama films
Films directed by Claude Sautet
Films produced by Claude Berri
Films set in restaurants
Films with screenplays by Jean-Loup Dabadie
Films scored by Philippe Sarde
French drama films
1980s French films